Chenrop Samphaodi (born June 2, 1995) is a Thai professional footballer who plays as a striker for Thai League 1 club Lamphun Warriors and the Thailand national team. He made his professional debut in a substitute in a 3-1 loss to Bangkok United on 4 April 2015.

International career
Chenrop won the 2015 Southeast Asian Games with Thailand U23, and scored two goals in the tournament. In 2016 Chenrop was selected in Thailand U23 squad for 2016 AFC U-23 Championship in Qatar. In March, 2016 Chenrop was called up in a friendly match against South Korea, and was substituted on in the second half of that match.
In August 2017, he won the Football at the 2017 Southeast Asian Games with Thailand U23.

Club career
In 2018 he signed a contract with Muangthong United.

International

International goals

under-23

Under-21

Honours

International
Thailand U-23
Sea Games  Gold Medal (2); 2015, 2017
Dubai Cup (1) :  2017
Thailand U-21
Nations Cup (1): 2016

Club
Port
 Thai FA Cup (1): 2019

BG Pathum United
 Thai League 1 (1): 2020–21
 Thailand Champions Cup (1): 2021

References

External links
 

1995 births
Living people
Chenrop Samphaodi
Chenrop Samphaodi
Association football forwards
Chenrop Samphaodi
Chenrop Samphaodi
Chenrop Samphaodi
Chenrop Samphaodi
Chenrop Samphaodi
Chenrop Samphaodi
Chenrop Samphaodi
Southeast Asian Games medalists in football
Footballers at the 2018 Asian Games
Competitors at the 2015 Southeast Asian Games
Competitors at the 2017 Southeast Asian Games
Chenrop Samphaodi